Darapsa is a genus of moths in the family Sphingidae first described by Francis Walker in 1856.

Species
Darapsa choerilus (Cramer 1779)
Darapsa myron (Cramer 1779)
Darapsa versicolor (Harris 1839)

References

Macroglossini
Moth genera
Taxa named by Francis Walker (entomologist)